Cristo negro is a Mexican telenovela directed by Tony Carbajal for Televisión Independiente de México in 1971.

Cast 
Enrique Lizalde
Jorge Lavat
Lupita Lara
Carmen Salas
Noé Murayama
Eusebia Cosme
Andrea Cotto
Alejandra Meyer
Rosángela Balbó
Sergio Zuani
Octavio Gómez

References

External links 

Mexican telenovelas
1971 telenovelas
Televisa telenovelas
1971 Mexican television series debuts
1971 Mexican television series endings
Spanish-language telenovelas